Thai rock is rock music from Thailand. Thai rock was influenced by rock bands from the United States and United Kingdom. Emerging in the 1980s it flourished with bands like Asanee-Wasan and Micro. It became widely popular in the 1990s.

1970s
Rock music emerged from the United States from a Blues rock base, gaining international popularity in the 1960s with bands like The Doors and musician Jimi Hendrix. The Thai rock genre began by Laem Morrison who performed for American soldiers during the Vietnam war.

Early rock bands in the genre include V.I.P., led by Lam Morrison, and The Fox musical group. who helped to make rock music mainstream.

1980s
Rock bands of this decade include The Olarn Project, Neua Gub Nang, and Rockestra. The most successful were Asanee-Wasan and Micro, both signed with GMM Grammy.

The Phleng phuea chiwit genre (influenced by elements of rock music) was popularized by Carabao with their album Made in Thailand, which sold over five million copies.

1990s
Heavy metal emerged, with bands such as Stone Metal Fire, Kaleidoscope, Donpheebin, Uranium, Big Gun and Hi-Rock. A popular Thai rock singer at that time was Itti Palangkul, Chatchai Sukkhawadee (Rang Rockestra), Thanapol "Suea" Intharit.

In the mid-1990s, alternative and indie music in Thailand was established, following the breakthrough of the American band Nirvana, whose success widely popularized alternative rock in the early-1990s, and the British band Oasis and Brit-pop movements in the 1990s. Several alt-rock bands sprung up, such as Moderndog, Silly Fools, Y Not 7, Sepia, Labanoon, Crub, Smile Buffalo, Paradox, Fly, Loso, Blackhead, and the artist Nakarin "Pang" Kingsak .

2000s
In the 2000s, Clash released their first album, "ONE". Their first single, "Gaud (Hug)" was a big hit, and led the band to success. The band "Kala" released their single "My Name is Kala". Big Ass released the album "Seven" in 2004, featuring the single "Len Kong Soong". The third album by Bodyslam, "Believe", was released in April 2005 and made them one of GMM Grammy's premier bands. The success of this album took them on a long national tour over the course of 2005 and part of 2006. They won the 4th Annual Fat Awards for "Favorite Album", and "Khwam Chuea" became "song of the year". The Richman Toy launched the single "Aod Aod (อ๊อด อ๊อด)" with a music video that was a parody of television programs of the 1960s. Jui Juis launched the single "Lesson 1 (บทที่ 1)". It is a folk rock song which was popular among teenagers. Bands currently successful in Thailand include  Ebola, Flure, Slot Machine, Potato, 25 Hours, So Cool, Slur, and Playground.

See also
Phleng Thai sakol
Music of Thailand
Thai contemporary art
Culture of Thailand

External links
Lam Morrison`s Facebookpage
Hi-Rock`s Facebookpage
The Olarn Project`s Facebookpage

Rock music by country
Thai popular music
Thai styles of music